The 1960 United States Senate election in Oklahoma took place on November 8, 1960. Incumbent Democratic Senator Robert S. Kerr ran for re-election to a third term. He won the Democratic primary in a landslide and then faced former U.S. Attorney B. Hayden Crawford, the Republican nominee, in the general election. Even as Vice President Richard Nixon was winning Oklahoma in a landslide over John F. Kennedy, Kerr was able to defeat Crawford by a wide margin, winning his third term. However, Kerr died just shy of two years into his third term, on January 1, 1963. He was replaced by Governor J. Howard Edmondson in the Senate and a special election was held in 1964.

Democratic primary

Candidates
 Robert S. Kerr, incumbent U.S. Senator
 Thomas C. Dunn
 D. R. Condo

Results

Republican primary

Candidates
 B. Hayden Crawford, former U.S. Attorney
 Herbert K. Hyde, former U.S. Attorney, 1936 Republican nominee for the U.S. Senate

Results

General election

Results

=

References

Oklahoma
1960
1960 Oklahoma elections